General Fleming may refer to:

Adrian Sebastian Fleming (1872–1940), U.S. Army brigadier general
Christopher Fleming, 17th Baron Slane (1669–1726), Irish-born Portuguese Army lieutenant general
James Fleming (British Army officer) (1682–1751), British Army major general
Lawrence J. Fleming (1922–2006), U.S. Air Force major general
Philip Bracken Fleming (1887–1955), U.S. Army major general
Raymond H. Fleming (1889—1974), U.S. Army major general

See also
Roger Le Fleming (1895–1962), British Indian Army major general
Attorney General Fleming (disambiguation)